Iro Lake is a cyclically occurring lake in the Moyen-Chari Region in southeastern Chad. It is fed in the summer and autumn months from the eastern arm of the Bahr Salamat, which forks seven kilometers southwest of the lake. The lake is about 100 kilometers north of the border with the Central African Republic. It is nearly circular, 13 kilometers long and 11 kilometers wide. During the dry season it can completely run dry.

It has been suspected that the depression is the remains of an impact crater.

See also
Bosumtwi Lake – a confirmed impact crater in Africa

References

External links
 http://www.geonames.org/2431230/lac-iro.html

Lakes of Chad